Robert S. Gold (born 1946) is a researcher in the application of computer technology to health education and health promotion. He was the founding dean of the University of Maryland School of Public Health (UMD SPH) and is the current chair of its Department of Epidemiology and Biostatistics.

Education 
Gold earned an Associate of Science degree from Orange County Community College in 1967, followed by a BS in biology from the State University of New York at Brockport in 1969. He earned his MS in health education at the same school two years later. Gold earned a PhD in health education from the University of Oregon in 1976, and a Doctorate of Public Health with a specialization in community health practice from the University of Texas School of Public Health at Houston in 1980.

Academic career 
Gold was an instructor in SUNY Brockport’s Department of Health Science (1970–1974) before earning his PhD at the University of Oregon and returned there as assistant professor from 1976 through 1978 after completing the degree. While working on his second doctorate at the University of Texas Health Science Center, School of Public Health in Houston, he served as an evaluator for the Texas Department of Mental Health and Mental Retardation. He next joined the faculty of Southern Illinois University at Carbondale (SIUC) in 1980 as associate professor of Health Education.

Gold received a leave of absence from SIUC in 1984 to serve as director of the School Health Initiative of the US Department of Health and Human Services. In 1986, he joined the faculty of the University of Maryland, College Park (UMD) as Professor of Health Education. From 1988 through 1989, he served at the World Health Organization (WHO) in Geneva where he was invited to help re-establish WHO's Division of Health Education/Health Promotion. In 1990, he began dividing his time between the University of Maryland and Macro International where he became vice president and director of public health research in 1994.

In 1999, Gold returned to a full-time faculty position at UMD and became Chair of its Department of Public and Community Health. In July 2002, he was Dean of the College of Health and Human Performance. In 2005 he proposed creating the University of Maryland School of Public Health which officially launched in September 2007. Gold served as the Founding Dean of the School of Public Health (SPH) until 2012 when he stepped down from that position. In March 2013, Gold became the Chair of the Department of Epidemiology and Biostatistics within the UMD SPH. He also served as Founding Director of the Public Health Informatics Research Laboratory at UMD and Professor of Public Health in the school.

Gold works in the application of advanced technologies to public health, ranging from interactive video, simulation and games for health, to knowledge management, decision support, and expert systems technology. Gold has published almost 100 refereed research and evaluation articles; dozens of pieces of software for organizations such as the American Cancer Society and the Department of Health and Human Services.

Selected Honors 
President's Medal, University of Maryland, College Park, October 2012

Honorary Doctor of Sciences, State University of New York, June 2012

John P. McGovern Medal for Distinguished Contributions to Health Education, American School Health Association, Honolulu, HI, July 2007

Elected Fellow, American School Health Association, October 2006

References

 Bernhardt JM, Alber J, Gold RS (2014) A Social Media Primer for Professionals: Digital Dos and Don'ts. Health Promot Pract 2014 Jan 6. [Epub ahead of print] DOI: 10.1177/1524839913517235
 Atkinson NL, Desmond SM, Saperstein, SL, Billing AS, RS Gold, and Tournas-Hardt A. (2010) Assets, Challenges, and the Potential of Technology for Nutrition Education in Rural Communities. Journal of Nutrition Education and Behavior; 42 (6), 410-416.
 Gold, R.S., and N.L. Atkinson.  (2005).  Imagine this, imagine that:  A look into the future of technology for health educators.  The Health Education Monograph Series; 23(1):44-48.
 Atkinson, N.L., & Gold, R.S. (2001).  Online research to guide knowledge management planning.  Health Education Research:  Theory and Practice, 16(6), 747-63.
 Bartholomew LK, Shegog R, Parcel GS, Gold RS, Fernandez M, Czyzewski DI, Sockrider MM, Berlin N. Watch, Discover, Think, and Act: a model for patient education program development. Patient Educ Couns. 2000 Feb;39(2-3):253-68.

External links
 Welcome From The Chair, Department of Epidemiology and Biostatistics, School of Public Health, University of Maryland
 Gold’s faculty webpage

American health educators
Fellows of the American Academy of Health Behavior
University of Oregon alumni
UTHealth School of Public Health alumni
Living people
1946 births